Oasis Investment Company LLC is the holding company of the Al Shirawi Group, one of the largest industrial conglomerates in the Persian Gulf region, spanning the printing, manufacturing, engineering services, trading, transport and logistics, marketing, distribution, contracting, service industries, and education.

Company 
The conglomerate comprises over 30 different companies, all with unique specializations, and more than 10,500 employees, and is currently ranked at 74 on the Forbes list of Top 100 Companies Making an Impact in the Arab World. The company was founded in 1971 and is based in Dubai, the United Arab Emirates and Canada

Key people 

Governance of the Al Shirawi group is maintained between generations within the Al Shirawi and Valrani families. Board Members are:

Abdulla M. Al Shirawi, Founding Chairman
Mohan G. Valrani, Founding Sr. Vice Chairman
Mohamed Al Shirawi, Chairman
Hisham Al Shirawi, Sr. Vice Chairman
Khalid Al Shirawi, Sr. Vice Chairman
Sumeet Valrani, Sr. Vice Chairman
Navin Valrani, Vice Chairman and Group Managing Director
Thani Al Shirawi, Vice Chairman and Deputy Group Managing Director
Kabir Valrani, Vice Chairman

References

Investment companies of the United Arab Emirates